Lady Finella (c. 950–995) was a noblewoman and Scottish assassin who killed King Kenneth II (some sources say King Kenneth III) out of revenge, based on chronicles from the 14th century.

She was the daughter of Cuncar, Mormaer of Angus, who was thought to be a descendant of Pictish royalty. Lady Finella is a well-known name that is rarely spelled the same way, and is also referred to as Fenella, Finuela, Finnguala, Fimberhele, Strath Finella, Strathfinella Hill, or Sibill, depending on the source. Most of her story is known through John of Fordun's chronicles written in the late 14th century, probably based on local, medieval folklore or 'feud-sagas'. He documented that Lady Finella's son was killed, most likely in battle, by Cinaed at Dunsinnan, a.k.a. Cinaed mac Máel Couim (Kenneth II MacMalcolm, king of Alba (971–995). Lady Finella was possibly enlisted by traditional factions opposed to the king's attempted feudal rule of primogeniture, the right of estates going to the first-born son. 

However, the story is that to seek revenge, and with help from the king's men or Cinaed's rivals, Lady Finella created an elaborate death-trap at a cottage in Fettercairn then lured King Kenneth II inside when he was visiting the area. Inside, a statue of a boy stood in the center of the main room. Lady Finella said that if the king touched the boy's head it would lead to 'amazing sport'. When King Kenneth II pulled the statue's head towards him it triggered a series of crossbows throughout the space that sent a hail of arrows into the king. True or not, it is established that Kenneth II was killed in Fettercairn in 995. The story continues that Lady Finella fled towards the coast where she was pursued and cornered by the king's soldiers at the top of a waterfall near St Cyrus. To avoid capture, Lady Finella threw herself over the waterfall from a height of 150 feet to her death. The valley where this supposedly took place is called Den Finella.

References 

950s births
995 deaths
Scottish assassins
British female murderers
Medieval assassins
Medieval Scottish nobility
Scottish noblewomen
Scottish regicides
Suicides by jumping in Scotland
Suicides in Scotland
10th-century Scottish people
10th-century Scottish women
10th-century criminals
Medieval suicides